Batmönkhiin Ganbold (born 22 October 1991) is a cross-country skier who served as the flag-bearer for Mongolia at the 2014 and 2018 Winter Paralympics Parade of Nations.

References

External links 
 

Cross-country skiers at the 2014 Winter Paralympics
Cross-country skiers at the 2018 Winter Paralympics
Mongolian male cross-country skiers
1991 births
Living people
21st-century Mongolian people